Angursa is a genus of tardigrades in the family Styraconyxidae. The genus was named and described by Leland W. Pollock in 1979.

Species
The genus includes six species:
 Angursa antarctica Villora-Moreno, 1998
 Angursa bicuspis Pollock, 1979 - Western North Atlantic
 Angursa capsula Bussau, 1992
 Angursa clavifera Noda, 1985
 Angursa lanceolata Renaud-Mornant, 1981
 Angursa lingua Bussau, 1992

References

Further reading
 Pollock, 1979 : Angursa bicuspis n.g., n.sp., a marine arthrotardigrade from the western north Atlantic. Transactions of the American Microscopical Society, vol. 98, no 4, p. 558-562.

Tardigrade genera
Styraconyxidae